Karen McDonald (also Phillips) is a fictional character from the British ITV soap opera Coronation Street, played by Suranne Jones. Karen was created by producer Jane Macnaught as a recurring character and one of the factory girls. She made her debut in the episode airing on 21 June 2000. On 13 May 2004, Jones announced her decision to leave the soap and her final episode was broadcast on 26 December 2004. Karen's storylines have focused on her number of boyfriends including, Vikram Desai (Chris Bisson) and Joe Carter (Jonathan Wrather), also her relationship with Steve McDonald (Simon Gregson) and her miscarriage and her feud with Tracy Barlow (Kate Ford), the mother of Steve's daughter, Amy.

Storylines
Karen arrived in Coronation Street in June 2000 as a friend of Linda Sykes (Jacqueline Pirie) who she used to work with at Wheelers. Karen was taken on as a new machinist at Underworld. She quickly found herself popular with the men of the street and had a fling with Vikram Desai (Chris Bisson). Over Christmas, she was drinking alone in The Rovers Return Inn and ended up spending the night with Peter Barlow (Chris Gascoyne).

In 2001, Karen was dating Steve McDonald (Simon Gregson). Her colleague, Janice Battersby (Vicky Entwistle) said that none of Karen's boyfriends ever took her seriously. Janice bet £10 that Karen wouldn't be able to get engaged, so Karen persuaded Steve to propose in front of The Rovers' regulars. Neither Karen nor Steve would back out but each thought that the other would. They held the reception at The Rovers. Six weeks later, they finally arranged their honeymoon in Florida. Having moved into the flat above StreetCars, Karen soon got fed up and they moved into the flat over The Kabin. Karen soon came up with her latest idea. She and Steve should separate so they could have the wedding of "their" dreams. She decided it must seem like the couple have fallen out so she staged arguments in The Rovers and threw his belongings out into the street, setting many residents against him. After many pleas, he had finally had enough and told her that the separation would happen but there wouldn't be another wedding. Karen tried desperately to stop the separation but was too late. She was surprised when Steve prepared a romantic night on a canal boat and proposed. They set a date for February 2004. However, over Christmas 2003, Tracy Barlow (Kate Ford) told Steve that he was the father of the baby she was expecting, not Roy Cropper's (David Neilson), following a one-night stand when he and Karen were apart. Unable to accept that Steve didn't want her, Tracy
cancelled the flowers for the wedding and the venue. Steve found out in time and managed to book another venue that Karen had wanted without her knowing. The second wedding day arrived and most of Weatherfield went. Tracy also went, determined to get her baby back and accidentally ruined the ceremony by blurting out that Steve was the baby's father when the Croppers insisted that the baby was staying with them. Karen was distraught that her dream wedding was ruined and that Steve had lied to her but they eventually remarried when Steve convinced Karen that Tracy meant nothing to him. When Karen learned about what Tracy had done to ruin her wedding, she was furious. Wanting revenge, she went to Amy's (Rebecca Pike) christening, determined to spoil the Barlows' day. The two women brawled in the church and Karen punched Tracy.

In August 2004, Karen's father, Malcolm Phillips (Richard Bremmer), turned up at her and Steve's flat. He informed Karen that her mother, Margaret, was dying and asked Karen to visit her but she refused and threw him out before telling Steve about her childhood. Karen's mother died a week later, sending Karen on an emotional rollercoaster. In November 2004, Karen went to Dublin to spend some time with Linda. Steve was tricked by Tracy and Liz McDonald (Beverley Callard) into going to London and find that the "McDonald-Barlows" were to appear on a new quiz show called "Top of the Tree". Steve conceded defeat and agreed to appear on the show and the family won a car, thanks to Karen being Steve's "Phone a Friend" and providing the winning answer, (yet she didn't realise that it was a game show). When Karen found out about the game show, she was fuming.
At the Underworld Christmas party, Karen started to have stomach pains and it was later confirmed that she had miscarried. Grieving, Karen was emotional and when she discovered that Liz had told Tracy about her miscarriage, she was furious. She took the car won on the game show, not realising that baby Amy was in the back, and set fire to it on the Red Rec. Tracy and Steve were frantic, thinking that Amy was dead, and this led to Karen and Tracy fighting on the roof of Underworld. Karen had dropped Amy off at the Croppers but didn't tell Tracy that, wanting to hurt her. The next day, Steve ended their marriage and told her to leave. Heartbroken, Karen pleaded for another chance but Steve refused so Karen left Weatherfield on Boxing Day 2004. Karen later filed for a divorce which was finalised in January 2006.

Casting
Suranne Jones was cast as machinist Karen by then producer Jane Macnaught in early 2000, having previously appeared briefly in April 1997 as Mandy Phillips, the girlfriend of Chris Collins (Matthew Marsden). In May 2004, just days after winning the award for 'Best Actress' at The British Soap Awards Jones announced that she was leaving the serial to pursue other projects with Granada TV.

Development

Steve McDonald
Rick Fulton of the Daily Record noted that Karen vows to be more "wily" with her romantic interests after seeing her friend Bobbi "wrapping boyfriend Vikram around her little finger". Her friend and colleague Janice makes a series of bets with Karen regarding how new boyfriend Steve treats her: this culminates in Janice betting Karen that she can get Steve to propose to her. Of the storyline, Suranne Jones stated that: "Karen can't believe she's on the verge of getting married for a bet". She characterises Karen as "not the type of girl to back out of a tricky situation" and states that she and Steve find themselves "in a game of bluff" with each "waiting for the other to pull out." Karen was the 53rd female character to get married in Coronation Street. Simon Gregson, who plays Steve, felt the marriage was "quite fitting" and that his character "thinks it's a bit of a laugh". The wedding scenes were filmed on 6 May 2001 and screened on 30 May 2001. Billy Sloan of the Sunday Mail stated that the scenes were "guaranteed to provide a bit of light relief" after serious storylines such as the rape of Toyah Battersby and Alma Halliwell's cancer diagnosis. Suranne Jones felt that Steve was "definitely the man for Karen" as the two characters had "similar personalities". She stated that Karen had dumped her previous boyfriend, Vikram, because he "wasn't racy enough and doesn't have the edge Steve has".

In September 2001 Suranne Jones stated that she "[feels] sorry for Steve sometimes" in regard to Karen's negative characteristics. She indicated that she'd "love to see Steve and Karen having the same impact on viewers as Dirty Den and Angie did". In November 2001 the two characters fall out because Karen insults Steve's mother Liz, though they later end up back together. Discussing the success of the pairing, Simon Gregson compared Steve and Karen to "a mini Jack and Vera" with "the shouting and the arguments" and "the feistiness of the characters". He added that Steve and Karen "can't live with each other and can't live without each other". Gregson also remarked that the relationship was "going back to what Coronation Street set out to be" which he felt to be "hen-pecked husbands and very strong women".

Departure
On 13 May 2004, it was revealed that Suranne Jones had decided to leave Coronation Street after four years of playing Karen McDonald. Discussing her reason for quitting Jones said: "I just think the time is right for me to move on and explore other acting opportunities". She also revealed that she loved playing Karen and thanked her co-stars including Simon Gregson who plays Steve McDonald and revealed that if it was not for the material and Gregson that she would not be where she is today and that she was very grateful. Jones also revealed that there would be a big fight scene between her and Tracy Barlow (Kate Ford) before she leaves. She filmed her final scenes in November 2004 and they were broadcast on Boxing Day 2004. Jones revealed that she would be open to returning to Coronation Street sometime in the future revealing that she told the producers that she wanted to do other things first before she went back.

Reception
The character of Karen was generally well received by the public and the British Media. In February 2002 The Sunday Mirror stated that Suranne Jones had "proved an instant hit with viewers" after joining the serial in June 2000. In December 2002 the Coventry Evening Telegraph ran a headline describing the character as "Britain's Favourite TV Bitch". In 2003, the 'will they, won't they?' storyline between Karen and Joe Carter was a ratings winner with over 15 million viewers tuning in, maintaining the high ratings of the highly successful Richard Hillman murder storyline. Karen and Steve's (second) wedding in February 2004, ruined by Tracy Barlow's revelation that her daughter Amy Barlow was Steve's love child, received 16.3 million viewers. After the announcement of her departure, Selina Scott of the Sunday Mail stated that Suranne Jones had "done as much as any of the [Coronation Street] cast to see off the challenge of EastEnders". She felt that Suranne Jones had made the "recklessly upwardly-mobile Karen into a genuine character" and was "the only thing that stops Steve 'Mogadon' McDonald becoming a cure for insomnia."

The Mirrors Nicola Methven and Polly Hudson predicted that the start of Karen's exit from the show would find "soapville on its knees in front of the TV, sobbing uncontrollably". They felt that the introduction of Karen's "fanatically religious parents" meant that "everything about the woman she is today started to make sense". The authors gave particular praise to the relationship between Karen and Steve, opining that Gregson and Jones "lit up the screen once again" and provided "pure [television] gold". Danielle Lawler, writing for The Sunday Mirror in November 2004 referred to a scene where Karen attacked Tracy as
"another classic clobbering". However, Frances Taylor of the Daily Record was critical of the character's exit plot. She stated that both "Karen McDonald—and the writers—lost the plot in spectacular fashion". She felt the character's exit was "pants" and expressed disappointment that the character of Tracy was left "to rule the Street". The character is remembered for her distinct personality and style: The Guardians Rosanna Greenstreet described her as "a bulldog in hoop earrings" in September 2005. Actress Kym Marsh, upon joining the serial stated that she wanted her character, Michelle Connor, to be like Karen: "a likeable lady, but with a serious attitude". In 2010 Gerard Gilbert of The Independent, reminiscing on the character, stated that Suranne Jones brought a "vital spark to Britain's best-loved soap, as a Victoria Beckham wannabe from the wrong side of the tracks." In a discussion of whether there is "life after Corrie" Ben Frow, head of TV3 broadcasting, compared Jones' portrayal of Karen to Katherine Kelly's portrayal of Becky McDonald. He states: "the successful ones [to have a career after Coronation Street]—like Suranne and Katherine—tend to play the few real, gritty, true characters in the soap." Andrew Billen of The Times described Jones as one of "those brave, talented few who earn their wings on a soap and then fly gloriously beyond it"

For her portrayal of Karen, Jones has won and been nominated for a number of awards. In 2002 she was nominated in the "Sexiest Female" and "Villain of the Year" awards at the British Soap Awards. At the 2003 Inside Soap Awards she won two awards; for Best Dressed Star and Best Couple (shared with Simon Gregson). In 2004 Jones won "Sexiest Female" at the Inside Soap Awards in addition to "Best Actress" at the British Soap Awards and "Most Popular Actress" at the National Television Awards. She also won Best Actress at the 2005 British Soap Awards.

References

External links

Coronation Street characters
Fictional factory workers
Fictional machinists
Television characters introduced in 2000
Female characters in television
Female villains